A V8 engine is an engine with eight cylinders mounted on the crankcase in two banks of four cylinders.

V8 engine may also refer to:
V8 (JavaScript engine), the JavaScript compiler used by Google Chrome

V8 engines in specific lines of automobiles
AMC V8 engine
BMW OHV V8 engine
Buick V8 engine
Cadillac V8 engine
Chrysler Spitfire V8 engine
Detroit Diesel V8 engine
Duramax V8 engine
Ford SHO V8 engine
GMC V8 engine
Holden V8 engine
Jaguar AJ-V8 engine, compact DOHC V8 piston engine
Lincoln V8 engine
Oldsmobile V8 engine
Pontiac V8 engine
Rolls-Royce V8 engine
Rover V8 engine
Yamaha V8 engine
Chevrolet Big-Block engine, series of large displacement V8 engines
Chevrolet small-block engine, series of automobile V8 engines
Chrysler FirePower engine, Chrysler's first V8 engine
Ford Flathead engine, first independently designed and built V8 engine produced by the Ford Motor Company for mass production
Ford Modular engine, V8 and V10 gasoline engine family
Ford Windsor engine, 90-degree small-block V8
GM small-block engine, V-8 engine utilized in General Motors' line of rear-wheel-drive cars and trucks
Toyota UR engine, 32-valve quad-camshaft V8 piston engine series

See also

V8 (disambiguation)